Cape Breton South is a former provincial electoral district in Nova Scotia, Canada which existed from 1933 to 2013.  It elected one member of the Nova Scotia House of Assembly.  In its last configuration, the district included Sydney and its western suburbs until the North West Arm and south along the Sydney River until Blacketts Lake.

In 1933, the County of Cape Breton was divided into five electoral districts, one of which was named Cape Breton South. In 2003, it lost part of the Ashby area to Cape Breton Nova and gained Balls Creek and the Coxheath area. Following the 2012 electoral boundary review, the district was dissolved into Northside-Westmount, Sydney-Whitney Pier and Sydney River-Mira-Louisbourg.

Members of the Legislative Assembly
The electoral district was represented by the following Members of the Legislative Assembly:

Election results

1933 general election

1937 general election

1941 general election

1945 general election

1949 general election

1953 general election

1956 general election

1960 general election

1963 general election

1967 general election

1970 general election

1974 general election

1978 general election

1981 general election

1984 general election

1988 general election

1993 general election

1998 general election

1999 general election

2003 general election

2006 general election

2009 general election

References
 
Elections Nova Scotia, Complete Poll by Poll Results (June 9, 2009). Retrieved August 5, 2009

External links
 riding profile
 June 13, 2006 Nova Scotia Provincial General Election Poll By Poll Results

Former provincial electoral districts of Nova Scotia
Politics of the Cape Breton Regional Municipality